The women's 4 × 100 metres relay was an event at the 1956 Summer Olympics in Melbourne, Australia. There were nine nations competing, with France, Poland and Canada failing to reach the final. The Australian team won in a world record time of 44.5 seconds.

Final classification

References

External links
 Official Report
 Results

W
Relay foot races at the Olympics
1956 in women's athletics
Women's events at the 1956 Summer Olympics